Armen Garnikovich Oganesyan (born April 4, 1954)
is the CEO of Russian state radio station Voice of Russia.   He was educated at Moscow State University, Department of Journalism.

References

Russian radio personalities
Russian people of Armenian descent
Living people
1954 births
Russian editors